Asif Iqbal (born 12 January 1984) is a Pakistani-born cricketer who played for the United Arab Emirates national cricket team. He made his One Day International debut against Hong Kong in the 2015–17 ICC World Cricket League Championship on 16 November 2015.

References

External links
 

1984 births
Living people
Emirati cricketers
United Arab Emirates One Day International cricketers
Cricketers from Bahawalpur
Bahawalpur cricketers
Pakistani emigrants to the United Arab Emirates
Pakistani expatriate sportspeople in the United Arab Emirates